Idaho Legislative District 22 is one of 35 districts of the Idaho Legislature. It is currently represented by Lori Den Hartog, Republican  of Meridian, John Vander Woude, Republican of  Meridian, and Jason Monks, Republican of Meridian.

District profile (1984–1992) 
From 1994 to 1992, District 22 consisted of Blaine, Camas, Gooding, and Lincoln Counties.

District profile (1992–2002) 
From 1992 to 2002, District 22 consisted of a portion of Gooding and Twin Falls Counties.

District profile (2002–2012) 
From 2002 to 2012, District 22 consisted of Boise and Elmore Counties.

District profile (2012–present) 
District 22 currently consists of a portion of  Ada County.

See also

 List of Idaho Senators
 List of Idaho State Representatives

References

External links
Idaho Legislative District Map (with members)
Idaho Legislature (official site)

22
Ada County, Idaho